The Denham Ministry was the 26th ministry of the Government of Queensland and was led by Premier Digby Denham, who led the Ministerialist party consisting of a mixture of liberals and conservatives. It succeeded the Kidston Ministry on 7 February 1911. The ministry was followed by the Ryan Ministry on 1 June 1915 after the government was defeated by the Labor Party at the 1915 state election on 22 May, at which several of the ministers including Denham himself lost their seats.

On 7 February 1911, the Governor, Sir William MacGregor, designated eight principal executive offices of the Government, and appointed the following Members of the Parliament of Queensland to the Ministry as follows:

  John Appel resigned from the Ministry after aligning with the new Farmers' Union party. Kenneth Grant, a former minister, was appointed in his place.

References
 
 

Queensland ministries